Lake Nipigon is part of the Great Lakes drainage basin. It is the largest lake entirely within the boundaries of the Canadian province of Ontario.

Etymology
In the Jesuit Relations the lake is called lac Alimibeg, and was subsequently known as Alemipigon or Alepigon. In the 19th century it was frequently spelled as Lake Nepigon. This may have originated from the Ojibwe word Animbiigoong, meaning 'at continuous water' or 'at waters that extend [over the horizon].' Though some sources claim the name may also be translated as 'deep, clear water,' this description is for Lake Temagami. Today, the Ojibwa bands call Lake Nipigon Animbiigoo-zaaga'igan.

The 1778 Il Paese de' Selvaggi Outauacesi, e Kilistinesi Intorno al Lago Superiore map by John Mitchell identifies the lake as Lago Nepigon and its outlet as F. Nempissaki. In the 1807 map A New Map of Upper & Lower Canada by John Cary, the lake was called Lake St Ann or Winnimpig, while the outflowing river as Red Stone R.  Today, the Red Rock First Nation located along the Nipigon River still bears the "Red Stone" name. In the 1827 map Partie de la Nouvelle Bretagne. by Philippe Vandermaelen, the lake was called L. Ste Anne, while the outflowing river as R. Nipigeon.  In the 1832 map North America sheet IV. Lake Superior. by the Society for the Diffusion of Useful Knowledge, the lake was called St Ann or Red L., while the outflowing river as Neepigeon and the heights near the outlet of the Gull River as Neepigon Ho. By 1883, maps such as Statistical & General Map of Canada by Letts, Son & Co., consistently began identify the lake as Lake Nipigon.

Geography

Lying 260 metres (853 ft) above sea level, the lake drains into the Nipigon River and thence into Nipigon Bay of Lake Superior. The lake and river are the largest tributaries of Lake Superior.

It is the 32nd largest lake in the world by area. The largest islands are Caribou Island, Geikie Island, Katatota Island, Kelvin Island, Logan Island, Murchison Island, Murray Island, and Shakespeare Island.

This was increased by about 60% to  after  of the Ogoki River basin were diverted in 1943 to the headwaters of the Little Jackfish River, a tributary of Lake Nipigon.

Geology

Lake Nipigon occupies a basin created by repeated and preferential erosion of relatively flat-lying and faulted, Proterozoic sedimentary strata and igneous sills by repeated Pleistocene glaciations. These red beds consist of basal fluvial-lacustrine conglomerates, sandstones, and shales overlain by cyclic dolomite-siltstone layers, stromatolites and red mudstones, which represent a playa lake, sabkha, and mudflat environments; purple shales and siltstones interpreted as subaerial mudflat deposits; and an upper unit of cross-stratified sandstone beds, which are interpreted to be aeolian in origin. They accumulated in an intracratonic rift basin between 1450 and 1500 million years (Ma) ago.

The Sibley Group unconformably overlies highly deformed and metamorphosed Archean turbiditic sandstones and metavolcanic and granitic rocks. The strata of the Sibley Group fill and are limited to a rift basin known as the Nipigon Embayment that underlies Lake Nipigon. Outside of the rift basin and east and west of Lake Nipigon, the Sibley Group is absent and erosion resistant Archean rocks are either exposed at the surface or blanketed by Pleistocene glacial sediments.

The Archean and Proterozoic strata are intruded by a number of mafic and ultramafic intrusions, which define the current outline of the Nipigon Embayment. They consist of relatively flat-lying and undeformed diabase sills known as the Nipigon diabase sills. The Nipigon diabase sills give evidence of rift-related continental basaltic magmatism during the Midcontinent Rift System event, estimated at 1,109 Ma ago. The mafic and ultramafic intrusions centered on Lake Nipigon is interpreted to represent a failed arm of the Nipigon embayment.

The Proterozoic rocks that underlie the Lake Nipigon region contain a variety of mineral resources. Although economic deposits have yet to be found, 1.53 billion-year-old anorogenic granites within the Lake Nipigon area potentially contain yttrium, zirconium, rare earth elements and tin mineralization. The clastic sedimentary rocks of the Sibley Group, are host to unconformity-related uranium and redbed-type copper ore deposits.

History
As the last ice age was ending, Lake Nipigon was, at times, part of the drainage path for Lake Agassiz.

Late 17th century: French Era (Fort la Tourette)
The French Jesuit Claude Allouez celebrated the first Mass beside the Nipigon River May 29, 1667. He visited the village of the Nipissing Indians who had fled there during the Iroquois onslaught of 1649-50.
In 1683, Daniel Greysolon, Sieur du Lhut established a fur trading post on Lake Nipigon named Fort la Tourette after his brother, Claude Greysolon, Sieur de la Tourette. The Alexis Hubert Jaillot map of 1685 (Partie de la Nouvelle-France) suggests that this fort was somewhere in Ombabika Bay at the northeast end of the lake where the Ombabika River and Little Jackfish River (Kabasakkandagaming) empty. This post, like most of the western French posts, was closed in 1696 by order of the king, when, due to a surplus of beaver pelts, the system of trading permits established in 1681 was abolished.

On 17 April 1744, the Count of Maurepas, Minister of the Marine, informed the Canadian officials that Jean de La Porte was to be given the "fur ferme" (i.e. the profits) of Lac Alemipigon from that year forward as a reward for his services in New France.

Mid 18th century: British, Ojibwe, and Canadian Territory 
After the Treaty of Paris (1763), the area passed into the hands of the British, and the Hudson's Bay Company expanded its trading area to include the Lake. Although it was considered to be within British North America, it was not until 1850 that the watershed draining into Lake Superior was ceded formally by the Ojibwe Indians to the Province of Canada (see Robinson Treaty, 1850, also known as the Robinson Superior Treaty). A four square mile reservation was set aside on Gull River near Lake Nipigon on both sides of the river for the Chief Mishe-muckqua (from Mishi-makwa, "Great Bear"). In 1871 Lake Nipigon was included in the new Thunder Bay District, Ontario.

The Township of Nipigon was incorporated in 1908. The Municipality of Greenstone (pop 5662) was incorporated in 2001 and includes Orient Bay, MacDiarmid, Beardmore, Nakina, Longlac, Caramat, Jellicoe and Geraldton.

In 1943 Canada and the United States agreed to the Ogoki diversion which diverts water into Lake Superior that would normally flow into James Bay and thence into Hudson Bay. The diversion connects the upper portion of the Ogoki River to Lake Nipigon. This water was diverted to boost the Sir Adam Beck Hydroelectric Generating Stations at Niagara Falls. The diversion is governed by the International Lake Superior Board of Control which was established in 1914 by the International Joint Commission.

Lake Nipigon Provincial Park is located on the east side of Lake Nipigon. In 1999 the park boundary was amended to reduce the park area from 14.58 to 9.18 square kilometres (3,603 to 2,268 acres). The area removed from the park was deregulated and transferred to the Government of Canada for a reserve for the Sand Point First Nation.
Douglas, R., ed. Nipigon to Winnipeg : a canoe voyage through Western Ontario by Edward Umfreville in 1784, with extracts from the writings of other early travellers through the region. Ottawa : Commercial Printing, 1929.

First Nations

The aboriginal population (primarily Ojibwe) include the Animbiigoo Zaagi'igan Anishinaabek (Lake Nipigon Ojibway) First Nation, the Biinjitiwaabik Zaaging (Rocky Bay whose name changed in 1961 from McIntyre Bay Indian Band) Anishinaabek First Nation, the Bingwi Neyaashi (Sand Point) Anishinaabek First Nation, the Red Rock (Lake Helen) First Nation and the Gull Bay First Nation. Formerly, the Whitesand First Nation was also located along the northwestern shores of Lake Nipigon until they were relocated in 1942. The membership of these six First Nations total about 5,000. Additionally along Lake Nipigon, there are three Indian reserves : McIntyre Bay IR 54 (Rocky Bay First Nation), Jackfish Island IR 57 and Red Rock (Parmachene) IR 53 (Red Rock First Nation).

The first nations CBC TV series Spirit Bay was filmed on the lake at the Biinjitiwaabik Zaaging Anishinaabek First Nation Reserve in the mid-1980s.

Transportation

The main line of the Canadian National Railway runs to the north of the lake. Another branch of the CNR touches the southeastern section of the lake at Orient Bay and Macdiarmid before heading inland to Beardmore. Ontario Highway 11 also skirts the southeastern section of the lake.

Water travel between Lake Nipigon and Lake Superior is impossible because of the existence of three dams that effectively hinders navigation.

References

External links

Facts about Canada - Lakes
International Lake Superior Board of Control
https://web.archive.org/web/20160304200835/http://wldb.ilec.or.jp/Lake.asp?LakeID=SNAM-099&RoutePrm=0%3A%3B4%3Aload%3B

Nipigon, Lake
Hudson's Bay Company trading posts